Bicyclus kenia, the Kenyan bush brown, is a butterfly in the family Nymphalidae. It is found in central and south-western Kenya, northern Tanzania, Uganda (the north shore of Lake Victoria) and southern Sudan. The habitat consists of montane forests.

Adults feed on fallen fruit.

References

Elymniini
Butterflies described in 1891
Butterflies of Africa